The Bulgarian Socialist Party (BSP), also known as The Centenarian, is a centre-left, social democratic political party in Bulgaria. The BSP is a member of the Socialist International, Party of European Socialists, and Progressive Alliance. Although founded in 1990 in its modern form, it traces its political heritage back to the founding of the BRDSP in 1891. It is also Bulgaria's largest party by membership numbers.

History 
The Centenarian moniker comes from the fact that the BSP is recognized as the successor of the Bulgarian Social Democratic Party, which was founded on 2 August 1891 on Buzludzha peak by Dimitar Blagoev, designated in 1903 as the Bulgarian Social Democratic Workers' Party (Narrow Socialists), and later as the Bulgarian Communist Party. After the political changes brought by the Revolutions of 1989, it abandoned Marxism–Leninism and refounded itself as the BSP in April 1990.

The party formed a government after the 1990 Bulgarian Constitutional Assembly election but was forced to resign after a general strike that December. A non-partisan government led by Dimitar Iliev Popov took over until the 1991 Bulgarian parliamentary election later in October. In the aftermath, the party was confined to opposition. As part of the Democratic Left coalition, a forerunner of the BSP for Bulgaria, it helped form a new government in 1995, headed by BSP leader Zhan Videnov as the prime minister of Bulgaria. Large-scale demonstrations in the cities and a general strike prevented the formation of a new socialist government after its term ended at the end of 1996. The country had entered into a spiral of hyperinflation, the most serious economic and financial crisis in its recent history, after the shock therapy and privatization policies, also followed to various degrees by other post-Communist countries.

In the 2001 Bulgarian presidential election, party chairman Georgi Parvanov was elected the president of Bulgaria on the second round, defeating on the second ballot incumbent candidate Petar Stoyanov from the Union of Democratic Forces (SDS). Parvanov resigned as party chairman and was succeeded by Sergey Stanishev. It was a break of the two-party system between the BSP and the SDS.

After two full terms out of power (1997–2001), the BSP-led Coalition for Bulgaria won the 2005 Bulgarian parliamentary election with 31.0% of the vote but without a governing majority, and formed the Stanishev Government, headed by the prime minister and BSP chairman Stanishev, with the centrist and social-liberal parties National Movement Simeon II and the Movement for Rights and Freedoms (DPS), respectively. In the 2006 Bulgarian presidential election, Parvanov was re-elected in a landslide, becoming the first Bulgarian president to do so in direct elections. In 2007, Bulgaria joined the European Union. The governing BSP-led coalition lost millions of euros of financial aid in the wake of allegations of widespread political corruption. The cabinet was also unable to react to the encroaching global financial crisis of 2007–2008 and its term ended with a budget deficit after several successive surplus years.

In the 2009 Bulgarian parliamentary election, the BSP was defeated by the new conservative party GERB, obtaining 37 out of 240 parliamentary seats (18%), and went into opposition. GERB assumed power through an anti-communist and anti-Turkish platform, calling the previous BSP-led government communist even though, as written in Jacobin by sociologist Jana Tsoneva, that government "had introduced some of the most radical neoliberal policies." In the 2013 Bulgarian parliamentary election, the party took 26.6% of the votes, second behind GERB with 30.5%. Plamen Oresharski, the party's candidate for prime minister, and the Oresharski Government were elected with the parliament support of the BSP and the DPS. The appointment of the controversial media mogul Delyan Peevski as head of the state security agency DANS sparked large-scale protests on 14 June. Protests against the Oresharski cabinet continued until the government resigned in July 2014. In the 2017 Bulgarian parliamentary election, the BSP made big gains but not enough to govern, as GERB made smaller gains as well, and the party remained in opposition to the Third Borisov Government, which included the far right United Patriots.

The BSP supported the 2020–2021 Bulgarian protests and led the left-wing opposition for a failed non-confidence vote. The protests ended when the prime minister Boyko Borisov resigned, but results after the April 2021 Bulgarian parliamentary election proved to be fragmented. After failed attempts from the BSP to form a government in the aftermath of an inconclusive July 2021 Bulgarian parliamentary election, the political crisis continued, as no government without the participation of Borissov could be formed, despite an anti-GERB majority. In addition, Korneliya Ninova, the party leader since 2016, has faced internal struggle, as the party has not been in government since 2013; the BSP has hesitated, depending on public opinion, between backing and rejecting There Is Such a People, the populist party created ahead of the anti-government protests and with the most seats. A third snap election for November 2021, this time also at the presidential level (2021 Bulgarian general election), ensued to solve the crisis. Following the election, Ninova decided to step down again although she will remain the chairman of BSP until the next party congress which will be held in January.

BSP agreed to be a part of the Petkov Government, together with PP, ITN and DB, receiving the ministries of social care, healthcare, agriculture and economy, with Chairwoman Korneliya Ninova also receiving the position of Deputy Prime Minister. 

During the January Congess, Ninova's resignation was rejected, meaning that Ninova continued on as Chairwoman of the BSP, until the end of her mandate in 2024.

Ideology 
Founded as the legal successor to the Bulgarian Communist Party, the BSP describes itself as a democratic socialist party, espousing socialist policies and values, while supporting a social market economy. It has also been described as a populist, and social-democratic party. The party's policies have oscillated during its existence from a customary understanding of socialism during the Videnov era, to a more social-liberal worldview under Stanishev, to a socially conservative strain of socialism under Ninova.

Like most Party of European Socialists (PES) member parties, the BSP has a pro-European stance, although it has taken some Eurosceptic positions and called for an end to sanctions against Russia. Some news outlets, such as Novinite, The Wall Street Journal, and The Washington Post, have described its orientation as soft Russophilia.

In recent times under the leadership of Korneliya Ninova and unlike the majority of PES parties, the BSP has been described as more conservative on social issues, and like European Union politics it is more divided, with some leaders, such as Ninova, opposing same-sex marriage in Bulgaria. Many party leaders opposed the Istanbul Convention because they were against educating children about sexuality if it also meant same-sex relationships, and after a long debate decided to vote against it, despite internal division about it. Former BSP leader and then-PES head Sergey Stanishev strongly supported the Istanbul Convention.

Membership 
The party is the largest in Bulgaria by number of members, having 105,000 members as of 2016, down from 130,000 in 2013, 150,000 in 2012, 210,000 in 2009, 250,000 in 1996, and around 1 million members during the late period of the People's Republic of Bulgaria. In 2020, it had 80,236 members.

List of chairmen

Videnov Era 
During the chairmanship of Zhan Videnov, the party followed the customary line for socialist parties – it rejected the large-scale privatization efforts of the SDS and instead moved toward a "mass" or "social" privatization campaign, which was intended to allow working and middle-class individuals ("the masses") to obtain stocks in various enterprises earmarked for privatization, as opposed to those shares only being sold to private investors on the stock market. The party under Videnov opposed what was perceived as the strong political and economic over-reliance on the United States, and instead sought to foster more friendly relations with the neighbouring PASOK-ruled Greece and SPS-ruled FR Yugoslavia.

Parvanov Era 
Parvanov, who had also been on the Bulgarian-Greek Parliamentary Friendship Committee, and was later elected as president of Bulgaria, chose to keep a degree of public distancing between party and state institutions and instead resigned his membership in the party following his elections. Though the Bulgarian constitution requires the President to resign any leadership positions within political parties, it does not require the officeholder to give up his party membership completely. He instead hand-picked Sergey Stanishev as his successor for the position. During his chairmanship, however, he opposed the NATO bombing of Yugoslavia. He stated that this was not a position against NATO, but only against its military operation. He stated that he would support Bulgaria's entry into NATO, but insisted that such an accession should only happen after negotiations with Russia. Though he was considered a member of the party's liberal wing, Parvanov also reached out to its more left-wing members and restored the party membership of Todor Zhivkov, who ruled the country for over 30 years during the socialist period and who was still very popular among socialists.

After having successfully completed two presidential terms, he re-joined the socialist party and initially put himself forward for another mandate as chairman, but withdrew it before the party's congress in 2012. Two years later, he was expelled from the party for "damaging its prestige", which he condemned as an authoritarian decision by the party's authorities. He then became the first former chairman to found his own separate party - the Alternative for Bulgarian Revival.

Stanishev Era 
Sergey Stanishev was noted in his policy shift away from the traditional understanding of the left, and toward a more pro-Western, pro-European and social-liberal worldview. Having formed what was dubbed a 'liberal' tripartite coalition, he signed the accords for Bulgaria's entry into the European Union and NATO, while also implementing economic reforms that were criticised as being neoliberal and contrary to socialism, such as the flat tax that replaced progressive taxation in the country. Because of this, he became highly polarizing within the socialist party, generating harsh internal opposition and leading to the defection of the party's leftmost wing - the 'Marxist platform'. Having decisively lost in the 2009 election, he was successful in managing to form a government after the 2013 election, however his approach backfired, as it required the parliamentary support of the pro-Turkish Movement for Rights and Freedoms and nationalist Attack, both of which proved incredibly controversial. This led to protests, culminating in the resignations of both Stanishev and the government. Following the end of his chairmanship, the party adopted what was popularly dubbed the "anti-Stanishev amendment", which effectively barred him from returning to this position in the future. Stanishev then left Bulgarian politics and instead moved to the European level, where he was elected as the chairman for the Party of European Socialists.

Mikov Era 
Mihail Mikov entered into his chairmanship under a promise to "consolidate and modernise" the party, as well as "protect its socialist and social democratic ideals", adding that the party's foremost responsibility was "the rehabilitation of the social state". However the unpopularity of the government led to a major decrease in support for the BSP, due to its association with the pro-Turkish Movement for Rights and Freedoms and nationalist Attack. In the 2014 Bulgarian parliamentary election the party obtained its worst result on record by that point. Mikov accepted responsibility for the result and chose to go into opposition. He nevertheless ran for re-election as Chairman of the Socialist Party, but lost to Korneliya Ninova, thus becoming the first incumbent socialist chairman to lose his bid for re-election. Ninova then became the first woman to be elected as the party's chairperson.

Ninova Era 
Ninova's initial approach to managing the party was to present for election independent popular candidates, who nevertheless shared much of the socialists' worldview, as the party's candidates. This was exemplified by her decision to back Rumen Radev, previously the non-partisan head of the Bulgarian Air Force in the 2016 Bulgarian presidential election. Radev, though nominally running as an independent candidate, was still nominated by the socialists and ran with Iliana Iotova, a leading socialist, as Vice president. This proved to be a recipe for success, as Radev convincingly defeated GERB candidate Tsetska Tsacheva in the election and was elected as President of Bulgaria. Ninova then managed moderate improvements in the party's electoral performance during the 2019 European Parliament election in Bulgaria. Despite this, the socialists were not able to overtake GERB and Ninova handed in her resignation, only to withdraw it shortly before it was due to be voted. The party also improved its results in the 2019 Bulgarian local elections, increasing its support across the board in the Bulgarian local scene and even winning some districts of the capital Sofia, a city known as a bastion of centre-right and right-wing politics. The socialists even nearly managed to win the position of Mayor of Sofia, with the party's candidate Maya Manolova narrowly losing out to the incumbent Yordanka Fandakova.

However and much more controversially, around this time Ninova began to shift the party's orientation toward traditionalism and social conservatism, advocating against same-sex marriage and the Istanbul Convention, as well as taking a harsh stance against perceived 'gender ideology'.

These changes to the party's philosophy also proved very internally divisive, and many factions formed to oppose Ninova within her own party, further galvanized by the fact that Ninova had taken part in privatization deals during the 90s. This internal opposition also accused Ninova of acting in a very authoritarian manner in attempting to crush internal dissent, comparing her to SDS leader Ivan Kostov. Because of this, the party suffered numerous defections. Several party branches disassociated themselves from the party, Maya Manolova refused to renew her membership and instead went on to form her own party Stand Up.BG, a significant portion of the party's parliamentary caucus left to form the Bulgarian Progressive Line, while a portion of the party's old-school membership left to form the Left Union for a Clean and Holy Republic, a broad left-wing alliance led by former BSP Chairman Zhan Videnov. Tatyana Doncheva's Movement 21 also refused to align itself with its former mother party, the BSP, and instead chose to join Stand Up.BG in creating the Stand Up.BG! We are coming! alliance. A faction of those within the internal opposition that still remained in the party formed the 'Socialism of the 21st century platform', which stated that it would fight Ninova's 'usurpation' of the party and work to 'restore the public image of socialism as the path to a more just and secure society'. According to this internal platform, the party under Ninova had become a leaderist power broker party, separated from its 150-year history.

Due to these and other reasons, the BSP obtained poor results during three consecutive snap parliamentary elections held in 2021, with the party obtaining its worst electoral result in its history. Due to this bad electoral performance, Ninova was asked, but refused to resign from her post. However, many party organizations, including the BSP's own youth wing demanded that she resign, which she agreed to do the following day. However, Ninova later stated that her resignation was not yet valid and she would remain the party's chairperson until a congress approved it at an undefined later date. Nevertheless, the BSP's national council gave Ninova its approval for her to negotiate the BSP's support for a government led by We Continue the Change, the new pro-Radev party that had won the November election.

In late November 2021, BSP agreed to enter the Petkov Government.

Electoral history

National Assembly

European Parliament

President

Symbols and logos

Notes

References

Bibliography

Further reading

External links
 

 
1990 establishments in Bulgaria
Political parties established in 1990